Harry Terrell Ables (October 4, 1883 – February 8, 1951) was a Major League Baseball pitcher for three seasons. Ables attended Southwestern University.

Ables was from Terrell, Texas and originally played for the Dallas Giants. On 30 July 1905 he threw two complete shut-outs and then moved to the St. Louis Browns. He moved to the Cleveland Naps in 1909 and the New York Highlanders in 1911. He died from lung cancer in San Antonio on 8 February 1951 and was buried there at the San Jose Burial Park.

References

External links

1883 births
1951 deaths
Major League Baseball pitchers
Baseball players from Texas
People from Terrell, Texas
St. Louis Browns players
Cleveland Naps players
New York Highlanders players
Southwestern Pirates baseball players
Memphis Egyptians players
Dallas Giants players
Birmingham Barons players
San Antonio Bronchos players
Oakland Oaks (baseball) players
San Francisco Seals (baseball) players
San Antonio Bears players
Deaths from lung cancer in Texas